Azad Mammadov (12 December 1964) is an actor of Shusha Musical Drama Theatre, Honored Artist of Azerbaijan Republic.

Biography
Azad Mammadov was born on December 12, 1964 in Shusha. In 1980-1984 he studied in kamancha class at Shusha Music Technical School named after Mir Mohsun Navvab and later worked here as a teacher. In 1988-1993 he studied at Azerbaijan State University of Culture and Art.

He has been acting as an actor in Shusha State Musical Drama Theatre since 1990, and as Deputy Director since 1994.

Azad Mammadov acted as both an actor and a musician at the concert "Nəğmədir, gülüşdür hər dərdə məlhəm". He has been a music designer for several productions in the theater: Jafar Jabbarly "Aydin", Suleyman Sani Akhundov "Greedy", Abdurrahim bey Hagverdiyev "Daghilan Tifag", Jalil Mammadguluzadeh "Kamancha", Ilyas Afandiyev "You are always with me", Nuraddin Qanbar "Burial of the monkey".

He played the role of a duck (mim) in a pantomime performance of "Üç nöqtə, vergül, nida, sual" (R.Shahsuvarov) at the Him-jim pantomime festival held in 1994, the role of "Hatamkhan Agha" in the performance of "Hekayəti Müsyö Jordan Həkimi-Nəbatat və Dərviş Məstəli Şah Cadükuni Məşhur" (M.F.Akhundov) at "National Classics" Festival in 1999, the role of male ("Musical Letters", F.Mustafa) and "Nikita Ivanich" ("Swansong", A.P.Chekhov) at the Theater Festival "The Completeness of Empty Space" in 2005.

Awards
The Golden Dervish Award of the Azerbaijan Union of Theater Figures (Together with the creative staff of the play "Əyri oturaq, düz danışaq") — 2002
Presidential Award — 2005
Honored Artist of Azerbaijan Republic — 25 June 2013

Main roles

References

Azerbaijani actors
Soviet people
1964 births
Living people